Sky Pirates (also known as Dakota Harris) is a 1986 Australian adventure film written and produced by John D. Lamond, and directed by Colin Eggleston. The film was inspired by Steven Spielberg's Raiders of the Lost Ark (1981), as well as borrowing liberally from The Philadelphia Experiment (1984), The Deer Hunter (1978), Dirty Harry (1971) and Mad Max (1979).

Plot
In 1945, the Second World War is about to come to an end. Meanwhile, the Australian military has come across an ancient device which can be used to travel through time. It is imperative that the Allies have it and the Axis powers do not.

The experienced aviator Lt. Harris (John Hargreaves) gets assigned to transport the precious item to Washington, D.C. Reverend Mitchell (Simon Chilvers), Mitchell's lovely daughter Melanie (Meredith Phillips), General Hackett (Alex Scott) and Major Savage (Max Phipps) are aboard the Douglas C-47 Skytrain transport. During the flight the power of the magic cargo makes the laws of nature fade, hereby causing a tremendous tempest which leaves Harris no other choice than to ditch the aircraft.

In rescue boats they discover a weird and misty area full of wrecked ships of different eras. Rev. Mitchell claims there was a connection to the so-called Philadelphia Experiment. Harris remains unimpressed and concentrates on the survival of Melanie and his crew, even for the price of immolating the arcane freight against Savage's explicit orders.

Back home Savage has Harris sentenced for insubordination by a military court. Harris escapes and seeks to unveil the background of these occurrences. He beseeches Rev. Mitchell's daughter Melanie to team up with him. Together they strive to retrieve the lost magic item. They disclose and confound Savage's hidden agenda before they become a happy couple.

Cast

 John Hargreaves as Lt. Harris
 Meredith Phillips as Melanie Mitchell
 Max Phipps as Major Savage
 Bill Hunter as O'Reilly 
 Simon Chilvers as Rev. Mitchell
 Alex Scott as Gen. Hackett
 Adrian Wright as Valentine
 Peter Cummins as Col. Brien
 Tommy Dysart as Bartender
 Arron Wayne Cull (as Wayne Cull) as Logan
 Alex Menglet as Sullivan
 Nigel Bradshaw as Spencer
 Chris Gregory as Appleton
 John Murphy as Gus

Production
Sky Pirates was able to utilize a number of warbirds that were found in Australia including CAC Mustangs, Douglas C-47 Skytrains, Grumman Mallards and North American B-25 Mitchells. Principal photography took place in Australia from May to June 1984.

Soundtrack
The music in Sky Pirates was composed by Brian May, who also scored the first two Mad Max films. The soundtrack was produced, edited and mastered by Philip Powers four years later as part of his Australian film music archive project on the label oneMone Records. Sky Pirates: Original Soundtrack Recording was released on CD in 1989.

Reception
Aviation film historian Simon Beck in The Aircraft Spotter's Film and Television Companion (2016) described Sky Pirates as "influenced by every Spielberg production made up to the mid-'80s."

Eleanor Mannikka in her review for AllMovie.com noted "A limp storyline refuses to go taut throughout this sci-fi adventure that patches together bits and pieces from its famous, multi-genre predecessors (the Indiana Jones series, The Deer Hunter, The Philadelphia Experiment, and others)".

Film historian Leonard Maltin, in Leonard Maltin's Movie Guide 2013 (2012), derided the "assorted nonsense" of Sky Pirates "Boring and confusing, but Hargreaves earns an A for effort."

Filmink magazine wrote "There’s enough genuinely good stuff in here (Hargreaves, Max Phipps, Brian May’s music score, Easter Island filming) to make you wish John Lamond had just stuck to producing and gotten in a writer to give it some shape."

References

Notes

Citations

Bibliography

 Beck, Simon D. The Aircraft Spotter's Film and Television Companion. Jefferson, North Carolina, 2016. .
 Maltin, Leonard. Leonard Maltin's Movie Guide 2013. New York: New American Library, 2012 (originally published as TV Movies, then Leonard Maltin’s Movie & Video Guide), First edition 1969, published annually since 1988. .
 Stratton, David. The Avocado Plantation: Boom and Bust in the Australian Film Industry. London: Pan MacMillan, 1990. .

External links

Sky Pirates at AustLit
Sky Pirates at Oz Movies

1980s science fiction adventure films
Australian science fiction adventure films
Australian aviation films
Films directed by Colin Eggleston
Films scored by Brian May (composer)
Films shot in Bora Bora
Easter Island in fiction
1980s English-language films